Crail) is a former royal burgh, parish and community council area (Royal Burgh of Crail and District) in the East Neuk of Fife, Scotland.

The locality has an estimated population of 1,630 (2018).

Etymology
The name Crail was recorded in 1148 as Cherel and in 1153 as Karel. The first element is the Pictish *cair (c.f. Welsh caer) meaning "fort", though this word seems to have been borrowed into Gaelic. The second element may be either Gaelic ail, "rocks", or more problematically Pictish *al; no certain instance of this word exists in P-Celtic. However, if the generic element were Pictish, then this is likely of the specific.

History
The site on which the parish church is built appears to have religious associations that pre-date the parish church's foundation in early mediaeval times, as evidenced by an 8th-century cross-slab preserved in the church. The parish church was itself dedicated (in the 13th-century) to the early holy man St. Maelrubha of Applecross in Wester Ross.

Crail Castle was an occasional residence of David I of Scotland during the 12th century but subsequently fell into ruin.

Crail became a royal burgh in 1178 during the reign of King William the Lion. Robert the Bruce granted permission to hold markets on a Sunday.

Mary of Guise, afterwards consort of James V, landed in Crail in June 1538 after a severe storm, and was hospitably entertained in the ancient mansion of Balcomie Castle, whence, accompanied by the king, she proceeded to St. Andrew's.

John Knox, visiting Crail on his way to St Andrews in 1559, was moved to deliver a sermon in Crail Parish Church. Afterwards, protesters went through the church and forcefully removed images which were put in place by previous generations but were now considered ideologically unsound. In August 1583, many of the inhabitants of Crail attacked nearby Wormiston House, which belonged to Sir John Anstruther. They filled up newly made ponds and ditches, and destroyed a plantation of ash trees. They were vexed at Anstruther because his new ditches had been built on land they claimed to belong to them as common land. The Privy Council of Scotland ordered them to rebuild the dykes.

In 2017, the Community Council was granted the Letters Patent to the Crail Shield and Coat of Arms. This was lost when the Royal Burgh of Crail Council was abolished in 1976.

Architecture

The most notable building in the town is the parish church, situated in the Marketgate – from the mid-13th century St Maelrubha's, in later medieval times St Mary's, but now, as part of the Church of Scotland's ministry, known just as Crail Parish Church.  It was founded in the second half of the 12th century. From early in its history, it belonged to the Cistercian Nunnery of St Clare in Haddington, East Lothian, and remained the Nunnery's possession until the Reformation. The kirkyard also includes a war memorial gateway of 1921.

Crail Tolbooth is near the juncture of Tolbooth Wynd and the Marketgate. It stands on its own at the edge of the large marketplace with its mercat cross in the centre of the town. This is where the Sunday markets were once held. (The former marketplace is now used as a car park.)  The tolbooth has a characteristic tower dating from about 1600 and a European-style roof, similar to buildings in Holland. The weathervane on the spire is in the form of a smoked haddock (known locally as a Crail Capon) rather than the traditional cockerel form.

The Crail Museum and Heritage Centre, largely staffed by volunteers and open every day in summer, is sited in a neighbouring building, also of historical interest, at the top of Tolbooth Wynd. It houses temporary exhibitions and has a permanent exhibition on RNAS Crail.

The Golf Hotel, on High Street, is Category A listed, dating to the 18th century or earlier.

Harbour
In 1610, the eastern pier was described as "new foundit" (newly built); however, by 1707 it was called "old and ruinous", requiring rebuilding.

The west pier was rebuilt in 1828 by Robert Stevenson. This work incorporated the crane on the southwest corner which lifts timbers into slots to seal the inner harbour.

The structure of the inner walls of the harbour features a highly unusual vertical coursing of the stones.

Notable residents
Andrew Duncan, minister exiled for opposing the policies of James VI ( c.1560–1626)
James Sharp, became Archbishop of St Andrews (1618–1679)
James Oswald (1710–1769), composer
William Dickson, footballer (1866–1910)
Oswald Wynd, author (1913–1998)
Joan Clarke, cryptanalyst and former fiancée of Alan Turing (1917–1996)

Carboniferous fossils
On the beach beside the harbour, there are fossilised trees related to Horsetails, dating back to the Carboniferous geological period.

Sport
The Crail Golfing Society is the seventh oldest in the world, formed in 1786. Their oldest course, Balcomie, was formally laid out by Tom Morris Sr. in 1894, but competitions had been played there since the 1850s.

Gallery

References
Citations

Sources

External links

 The Royal Burgh of Crail and District Community Council

 
Towns in Fife
Royal burghs
Parishes in Fife